Likati River is a river of northern Democratic Republic of the Congo, a tributary of the Itimbiri River.
It flows through Aketi Territory in Bas-Uele District. 

It was referenced in Congo Shadows by John B. Franz.

At Libongo, northwest of the town of Likati, the river is crossed by a mixed-use road and railway bridge.
As of 2014 the bridge was defective and dangerous for road users.
The railway, now defunct, was a branch of the Vicicongo line built by the Société des Chemins de Fer Vicinaux du Congo.

References

Sources

Rivers of the Democratic Republic of the Congo